Hortonia is a genus of trees and shrubs of the family Monimiaceae. It is endemic to Sri Lanka and comprises three species.

Species
 Hortonia angustifolia Trimen. 
 Hortonia floribunda Wight. ex Arn.
 Hortonia ovalifolia Wight.

References

 
 
 
 
 http://www.theplantlist.org/1.1/browse/A/Monimiaceae/Hortonia/

Monimiaceae genera